A pincer is the part of an arthropod that enables it to carry loads, to defend against other creatures, or to attack prey. In insects, the pincers are usually part of the creature's mandible, and often venom or acid can be injected through the pincer into an enemy during a pincer strike.

Some arthropods such as crabs, lobsters, and scorpions possess pincers in the form of chelae at the ends of their front limbs (pedipalps), to assist in feeding, defence or even courtship.

See also
 Chela (organ)
 Krukenberg procedure
 Pedipalp
 Pincer (tool)

References

Arthropod anatomy